Michèle Desbordes (4 August 1940, Saint-Cyr-en-Val (Loiret) – 24 January 2006, Baule (Loiret), aged 65) was a French writer. A curator of university libraries, she received several awards for her story La Demande devoted to Leonardo da Vinci.

Biography 
After studying literature at the Sorbonne, she became curator in libraries in Parisian universities, then in Guadeloupe in public readings. In 1994, she was appointed director of the University Library of Orléans. From her home in Baule she wrote poems and novels.

Works 
1986: Sombres dans la ville où elles se taisent (poetry), Arcane 17
1997: L'Habituée, 
1999: La Demande, Verdier
2000: Le Commandement, Gallimard
2001: Le Lit de la mer, Gallimard
2004: La Robe bleue, Verdier, inspired by the story of Camille Claudel
2004: Dans le temps qu'il marchait, éditions Laurence Teper
2005: Un été de glycine, Verdier
2006: L'Emprise, Verdier
2006: Artemisia et autres proses, éditions Laurence Teper
2008: Les Petites Terres, éditions Verdier

Distinctions 
For her work La Demande, 1999.:
 Prix du roman France Télévisions 1999
 Prix du Jury Jean-Giono 1999
 Prix des auditeurs de la RTBF 1999
 Flaiano Literary Prize 2001

References

External links 
 Michèle Desbordes, romancière on Le Monde
 Michèle Desbordes on Who's who in France
 Michèle Desbordes on France Culture

20th-century French non-fiction writers
21st-century French non-fiction writers
French curators
1940 births
People from Loiret
2006 deaths
French women novelists
20th-century French women writers
21st-century French women writers
French women curators